German submarine U-523 was a Type IXC U-boat of Nazi Germany's Kriegsmarine during World War II. The submarine was laid down on 4 August 1941 at the Deutsche Werft yard in Hamburg as yard number 338. She was launched on 15 April 1942, and commissioned on 25 June under the command of Kapitänleutnant Werner Pietzsch. After training with the 4th U-boat Flotilla in the Baltic Sea, the U-boat was transferred to the 10th flotilla for front-line service on 1 February 1943.

Design
German Type IXC submarines were slightly larger than the original Type IXBs. U-523 had a displacement of  when at the surface and  while submerged. She had two shafts and two  propellers.

U-523 was fitted with six  torpedo tubes (four fitted at the bow and two at the stern), 22 torpedoes, one  SK C/32 naval gun, 180 rounds, and a  SK C/30 as well as a  C/30 anti-aircraft gun. The boat had a complement of forty-eight.

Service history

First patrol
U-523 departed Kiel on 9 February 1943 and sailed out into the mid-Atlantic. Around 20:00 that evening, U-523 discovered the drifting wreck of the Mathew Luckenbach and hit her with a single torpedo, sinking the ship within seven minutes. The U-boat arrived at her new home port of Lorient, in occupied France, on 16 April 1943 after 67 days at sea.

Second patrol
U-523 sailed from Lorient on 22 May 1943, but on the 24th, still in the Bay of Biscay, she was bombed by a British Whitley medium bomber of No. 10 Squadron RAF. The U-boat was severely damaged and was forced to return to Lorient.

Third and fourth patrols
U-523 sailed from Lorient briefly on 1 August 1943, for a voyage lasting only three days, before setting out once more on 16 August, and headed south-west.

The U-boat was sunk on 25 August, west of Vigo, Spain, in position , by depth charges from the destroyer  and the corvette . Seventeen of U-523s crew were killed and 37 survived the attack.

Wolfpacks
U-523 took part in four wolfpacks, namely:
 Burggraf (24 February – 5 March 1943)
 Westmark (6 – 11 March 1943)
 Stürmer (11 – 20 March 1943)
 Seeteufel (23 – 30 March 1943)

Summary of raiding history

References

Bibliography

External links

German Type IX submarines
U-boats commissioned in 1942
U-boats sunk in 1943
U-boats sunk by depth charges
U-boats sunk by British warships
World War II submarines of Germany
World War II shipwrecks in the Atlantic Ocean
1942 ships
Ships built in Hamburg
Maritime incidents in August 1943